

The Torréns Bridge is a historic bridge over the Rosario River in Hormigueros municipality, Puerto Rico. It was built in 1878 in a beam bridge structure with lattice girders and transverse joists, a design unique in the later territory of the United States. It is named for Modesto Torréns Morales, mayor of Hormigueros from 1875 to 1879, during a period when the municipality advocated for improved transportation linkages from the settlement of Hormigueros to the rest of the island. Improvement of the difficult Rosario River crossing (Paso de las Nieves) on the road from the town to the main highway south of the river was seen as critical to economic development, especially after Hormigueros municipality separated from San Germán in 1874. In 1898 during the Spanish–American War, the Torréns Bridge was captured by the U.S. Army to aid its advance during the Battle of Hormigueros and subsequent march on Mayagüez.

The bridge was added to the U.S. National Register of Historic Places in 2000.

See also
 Maricao Fish Hatchery: located along the Río Rosario in Maricao, Puerto Rico
 National Register of Historic Places listings in Hormigueros, Puerto Rico

Notes

References

External links
 
 Summary sheet from the Puerto Rico State Historic Preservation Office 

Road bridges on the National Register of Historic Places in Puerto Rico
Lattice truss bridges
Beam bridges
Bridges completed in 1878
Hormigueros, Puerto Rico
Spanish–American War
1878 establishments in Puerto Rico
Girder bridges in the United States